Thorny frog may refer to:

 Brown thorny frog, a frog found in the Malay Peninsula, Borneo, and the Philippines
 Thorny spikethumb frog, a frog found in Guatemala and Mexico
 Thorny tree frog, a frog native to Vietnam

Animal common name disambiguation pages